Retinoblastoma-like 1 (p107), also known as RBL1, is a protein that in humans is encoded by the RBL1 gene.

Function 

The protein encoded by this gene is similar in sequence and possibly function to the product of the retinoblastoma 1 (RB1) gene. The RB1 gene product is a tumor suppressor protein that appears to be involved in cell cycle regulation, as it is phosphorylated in the S to M phase transition and is dephosphorylated in the G1 phase of the cell cycle. Both the RB1 protein and the product of this gene can form a complex with adenovirus E1A protein and SV40 Large T-antigen, with the SV40 large T-antigen binding only to the unphosphorylated form of each protein. In addition, both proteins can inhibit the transcription of cell cycle genes containing E2F binding sites in their promoters. Due to the sequence and biochemical similarities with the RB1 protein, it is thought that the protein encoded by this gene may also be a tumor suppressor. Two transcript variants encoding different isoforms have been found for this gene.

Interactions 

Retinoblastoma-like protein 1 has been shown to interact with:

 BEGAIN, 
 BRCA1, 
  BRF1, 
 Cyclin A2, 
 Cyclin-dependent kinase 2, 
 E2F1, 
 HDAC1, 
 MYBL2 
 Mothers against decapentaplegic homolog 3,
 Prohibitin,  and
 RBBP8.

See also 
 Pocket protein family

References

Further reading

External links 
 

Transcription factors